Tom Hasslan (born 1983) is a Norwegian jazz guitarist. He was born in Kongsberg. He is mainly known as a member of the Krokofant trio with drummer Axel Skalstad and saxophonist Jørgen Mathisen.

Discography 
 With Soft Ffog
 2022: Soft Ffog (Is It Jazz? Records)
 With Krokofant
 2014: Krokofant (Rune Grammofon)
 2015: Krokofant - II (Rune Grammofon)
 2017: Krokofant - III (Rune Grammofon)
2019 : Q, Krokofant with Ståle Storløkken and Ingebrigt Håker
2021 : Fifth, Krokofant with Ståle Storløkken and Ingebrigt Håker

References

External links 
Tom Hasslan group på Energimølla Kongsberg 29 September 2017 at YouTube

Norwegian jazz musicians
21st-century Norwegian guitarists
Norwegian jazz guitarists
Norwegian jazz composers
Male jazz composers
1983 births
Living people
Musicians from Kongsberg
21st-century Norwegian male musicians